Brachysternaster chesheri is a species of sea urchins of the Family Paleopneustina incertae sedis B. Their armour is covered with spines. Brachysternaster chesheri was first scientifically described in 1985 by Larrain.

See also 

 Breynia australasiae
 Breynia desorii
 Breynia elegans

References

Animals described in 1985
Spatangoida